Soon after the release of HyperCard in 1987, computer viruses appeared that targeted the application. The viruses were written in the HyperTalk programming language and typically spread by infecting the Home stack and then infecting other stacks from there.

List of viruses

References

Classic Mac OS viruses